"I'd Do Anything" is a song by English band Dead or Alive. It was co-produced by the band and Zeus B. Held and released in January 1984 as the third single from the band's debut studio album Sophisticated Boom Boom.

The song was the third consecutive single by Dead or Alive to miss the UK top 75, peaking at No. 79 on the UK Singles Chart. The band would gain moderate success with the release of their next single, a cover version of KC and the Sunshine Band's "That's the Way (I Like It)" which peaked at No. 22.

Track listing

Chart performance

References

External links
 

1984 songs
1984 singles
Dead or Alive (band) songs
Songs written by Pete Burns
Songs written by Mike Percy (musician)
Epic Records singles